"I'm Available" is a song written by Dave Burgess and performed by Margie Rayburn. It reached #9 on the US pop chart in 1957.

Other versions
Bonnie Lou released a version of the song as a single in 1957.
Line Renaud released a version of the song as a single in Germany in 1958.
Cathy Carroll released a version of the song as a single in 1963.

References

1957 songs
1957 singles
1958 singles
1963 singles
Margie Rayburn songs
Bonnie Lou songs
Liberty Records singles
King Records (United States) singles
Warner Records singles